Mississippi Highway 510 (MS 510) is a state highway in eastern Mississippi. The route starts at MS 145 near Shubuta and travels eastward. The road turns southward near Matherville, and the route ends southeast of the unincorporated area. The road was constructed around 1957, and majority of the road was paved by 1967. A portion of the route east of Matherville was removed from the state highway system in 1999.

Route description

The route is located in northern Wayne and southern Clarke counties. MS 510 is legally defined in Mississippi Code § 65-3-3, and all of it is maintained by the Mississippi Department of Transportation (MDOT), as part of the Mississippi State Highway System.

MS 510 starts at a three-way junction with MS 145 south of Shubuta in Wayne County, and it travels northward towards the Wayne–Clarke county line. The road crosses the county line, and it turns east at County Road 612 (CO 612). The route enters a large area of farmland, and it crosses Carson Sand Creek. It curves northward until it reaches the Choctaw Base Line, where it begins travelling eastward again. Past CO 611, MS 510 crosses Dry Creek and Shiloh Creek. The road intersects CO 617, which leads to Langsdale. At CO 610, the route turns south towards the county line. MS 510 crosses the county line past CO 6101. The route turns southeast near L.B. Odom Drive in Matherville, and state maintenance ends southeast of the unincorporated area. The road continues as Matherville–Frost Bridge Road, which ends at U.S. Route 84 (US 84).

History
Around 1957, a gravel road was constructed from US 45 near Shubuta to US 84 near Waynesboro, and it was designated as MS 510. The eastern terminus was rerouted closer to the Mississippi–Alabama state line by 1962. In January 1965, a project to grade and add culverts to the road began, costing $386,157.67. By 1967, the majority of the route was paved, with a small section remaining in gravel near US 84. A section of the route from the beginning of the gravel section to US 84 became locally maintained by 1998, and it was removed from the state highway system by 1999. By 2001, US 45 was rerouted to a new bypass around Shubuta, with MS 510 still connected to US 45's old alignment.

Major intersections

References

510
Transportation in Wayne County, Mississippi
Transportation in Clarke County, Mississippi